Charles Rahmel Jones (born July 17, 1975) is a retired American professional basketball player who played in the National Basketball Association (NBA), with the Chicago Bulls (NBA) & Los Angeles Clippers (NBA).

Raised in Bedford–Stuyvesant, Brooklyn, New York, Jones was one of two children of Charles and Cathy Jones and graduated from Bishop Ford Central Catholic High School in 1993. His brother Lamont Jones is also a basketball player. In 1997, Jones estimated to The New York Times that around 15 of his friends from Bedford-Stuyvesant were killed on the streets.  He played at The Soul in the Hole in Brooklyn.

Jones attended Rutgers University and Long Island University, before spending two seasons in the NBA for the Chicago Bulls (1998–99) and the Los Angeles Clippers (1999–2000). He would later decline a contracts before signing in Italy. Due to a fracture of his shooting hand, he would continue to play abroad despite never receiving therapy, notable stops in Greece, Bulgaria & Argentina. When League & cup titles in Bulgaria & a league title in Argentina

While playing for Long Island University, he led the league in scoring twice (1996–97, 1997–98), and he was the last player to average 30 points or more in a season when he averaged 30.1 points per game in the 1996–97 season before Marcus Keene reached that mark during the 2016–17 season. (See List of college basketball scoring leaders) He finished his senior season top 10 in Division I basketball in assists (5th) and steals(9), leading the conference in points per game, assists per game and steals per game. A prolific scorer, he currently still holds multiple school and conference records. College & Streetball Legend that is arguably one of the top skill developers.

References

External links
NBA stats @ basketball-reference.com

1975 births
Living people
21st-century African-American sportspeople
African-American basketball players
Albany Patroons players
American expatriate basketball people in Argentina
American expatriate basketball people in Bulgaria
American expatriate basketball people in Greece
American expatriate basketball people in Israel
American expatriate basketball people in Italy
American men's basketball players
Basketball players from New York City
BC Levski Sofia players
Chicago Bulls players
Ciclista Olímpico players
Gimnasia y Esgrima de Comodoro Rivadavia basketball players
Ionikos N.F. B.C. players
Libertad de Sunchales basketball players
LIU Brooklyn Blackbirds men's basketball players
Los Angeles Clippers players
Montecatiniterme Basketball players
PBC Academic players
Point guards
Rutgers Scarlet Knights men's basketball players
Shooting guards
Sportspeople from Brooklyn
Undrafted National Basketball Association players
20th-century African-American sportspeople